The Artur Schnabel Wettbewerb is an intern piano competition organized by the Berlin University of the Arts since 1986. While aimed to the institution's alumni, in recent editions pianists under the Hochschule für Musik Hanns Eisler have joined it.

Palmares
{| border="1"
|+ Prize Winners
! Year
|-
!1986 !! 1st Prize !! 2nd Prize !! 3rd Prize
|-
|| ||  Hie-Yon Choi ||   | Andras Vermesy | Iwan König  Emiko Kumagai
|-
!1987 !! 1st Prize !! 2nd Prize (ex-a.) !! 3rd Prize !! Special Prize
|-
|| || not awarded ||  Nobuko Kondo ||  Jeong-Won Ham ||  Sebastian Störmer
|-
|| || ||  Yoko Saito ||
|-
!1989 !! 1st Prize !! 2nd Prize !! 3rd Prize !! Special prizes
|-
|| ||  Kyoko Tabe ||  Sang-Jean Shin ||  Jeong-Won Ham ||  Thoralf Gütter
|-
|| || || || ||  Tomoko Takahashi
|-
!1990 !! 1st Prize !! 2nd Prize (ex-a.) !! 3rd Prize
|-
|| ||  Markus Groh ||  Jan Michiels ||  Susumu Aoyagi
|-
|| || ||  Corinna Söller ||
|-
!1992 !! 1st Prize !! 2nd Prize !! 3rd Prize !! Special Prizes
|-
|| ||  Daniel Goiti ||  Kyoung-Ah Choi ||  Tomoko Takahashi ||  Maria Ivanova
|-
|| || || || ||  Yukiko Shioda
|-
!1994 !! 1st Prize !! 2nd Prize !! 3rd Prize (ex-a.)
|-
|| ||   Cristina Marton ||  Yukiko Shioda ||  Tachmina Chmelnitzki 
|-
|| || || ||  Håvard Gimse
|-
!1995 !! 1st Prize !! 2nd Prize !! 3rd Prize (ex-a.)
|-
|| ||  Karina Jermaka ||  Noriko Ishiguro ||  Keiko Ishitobi 
|-
|| || || ||  Stefan Veselka
|-
!1997 !! 1st Prize !! 2nd Prize !! 3rd Prize (ex-a.)
|-
|| ||  Masaru Okada ||  Kiai Nara ||  Yun-Hee Jung
|-
|| || || ||  Jin-Son Kim
|-
!1998 !! 1st Prize !! 2nd Prize !! 3rd Prize !! Special Prizes
|-
|| ||  Severin von Eckardstein ||  Maria Roumiantseva || not awarded ||  Rie Okamura
|-
|| || || || ||  Oleg Roshin
|-
!2000 !! 1st Prize !! 2nd Prize !! 3rd Prize (ex-a.)
|-
|| || not awarded ||  Ulugbek Palvanov ||  Ekaterina Roumiantseva 
|-
|| || || ||  Benoît Ziegler
|-
!2001 !! 1st Prize !! 2nd Prize !! 3rd Prize (ex-a.)
|-
|| ||  Gergely Bogányi ||  Norie Takahashi ||  Mădălina Pașol de Martin
|-
|| || || ||  Dingyuan Zhang
|-
!2002 !! 1st Prize !! 2nd Prize (ex-a.) !! 3rd Prize !! Special Prize
|-
|| || not awarded ||  Emre Eliver ||  void ||  Alina Luschtschizkaja
|-
|| || ||  Olga Monakh ||
|-
|| || ||  Ulugbek Palvanov ||
|-
!2004 !! 1st Prize (ex-a.) !! 2nd Prize !! 3rd Prize
|-
|| ||  Benjamin Moser ||  Motoi Kawashima ||  Naoko Fukumoto
|-
|| ||  Alexander Yakovlev || ||  Huijing Han
|-
!2005 !! 1st Prize !! 2nd Prize !! 3rd Prize !! Special prizes
|-
||  ||  Mi-Yeon Lee ||   Lucas Blondeel ||  Yohei Wakioka ||  Akiko Nikami
|-
|| || || || ||  Li-Chun Su
|-
!2007 !! 1st Prize (ex-a.) !! 2nd Prize !! 3rd Prize !! Special prize
|-
|| ||  Eugen Dietrich ||  Eun-Young Seo || void
|-
|| ||  Li-Chun Su || || 
|-
|}

References
  Berlin University of the Arts

Piano competitions
Music competitions in Germany